Apum was an ancient Amorite kingdom located in the upper Khabur valley, modern northeastern Syria. It was involved in the political and military struggle that dominated the first half of the 18th century BC and led to the establishment of the Babylonian Empire. Apum was incorporated into Babylon in 1728 BC and disappeared from the records.

History
The majority of the kingdom inhabitants were Amorites. Originally, Apum was a small city perhaps located in the vicinity of modern-day Qamishli. The kingdom was attested for the first time in the Archives of Mari (c. 1774 BC). At the time of its attestation, Apum was already in control of the old Assyrian capital Shubat-Enlil which became Apum's capital. In 1771 BC, Apum received a warning from Mari's monarch Zimri-Lim regarding an Eshnunnite attack, however, the Apumites were unable to resist and their capital was occupied by the invading force.

Following the Eshnunnite main force departure, Apum's king Zuzu became a vassal to Eshnnuna and was entrusted in commanding the Eshnunnite garrison. Soon after, Apum was attacked by the neighboring kingdom of Qattara who occupied the capital, but was evicted by the Eshnunnites. Afterwards, Apum was overrun by an Elamite invasion led by a general named Kunnam, who shared the power with the Apumite king Haya-Abum, who was a vassal of Mari. The Elamites left in 1765 BC, and the capital of Apum was invaded by the kingdom of Andarig. However, it is certain that by 1750 BC, Apum's dynasty was in firm control over its capital, after an alliance with the kingdom of Kurda that drove the Andarigites out. Apum came to an end after the invasion of the Babylonian king Samsu-Iluna in 1728 BC.

Rulers

See also

 Amorite language
 Hurrians

References

Citations

Ancient Near East
Ancient Syria
History of Kurdistan
Amorite cities
Former kingdoms